David Basinger is professor of philosophy at Roberts Wesleyan College, Rochester, New York. He is also the Vice President for Academic Affairs and the Chief Academic Officer at Roberts Wesleyan College. Basinger graduated from Grace College, Bellevue College, and University of Nebraska-Lincoln, with an MA and PhD. He is a proponent of open theism.

Works

 Reason and Religious Belief:  An Introduction to the Philosophy of Religion, 3rd edition (New York:  Oxford Press, 2003).
 “Theodicy:  A Comparative Analysis” in Semper Reformandum: Studies in Honour of Clark Pinnock, eds., Stanley Porter and Anthony Cross (Crumbia, UK: Paternoster Press, 2003)
 Religious Diversity: A Philosophical Assessment (Ashgate Press, 2002)

References

Roberts Wesleyan University faculty
Year of birth missing (living people)
Living people
University of Nebraska–Lincoln alumni
Philosophers from New York (state)
Bellevue College alumni
Grace College alumni